McGuffey Lane is an American country rock band from Athens, Ohio, and/or Columbus, Ohio, United States. The group was formed in 1972 by Terry Efaw and Steve Reis, who played together under the name Scotch & Soda. After adding songwriter, lead singer, and guitarist Bobby E. McNelley, they branded themselves McGuffey Lane, the location of Reis's Athens, Ohio, home.

The band eventually expanded to a sextet and became well-known locally, releasing their first album on their own Paradise Island record label. The LP sold more than 40,000 copies, and eventually resulted in their signing with Atco Records. They reissued the debut in 1980 and toured with the Charlie Daniels Band, The Judds, and the Allman Brothers Band. The follow-up, Aqua Dream, featured the single "Start It All Over", which spent three weeks on the Billboard Hot 100, peaking at number 97 in February 1982.

The group scored several minor hits on the country charts, but their label wanted to market them more as a pop-country act in the vein of Alabama. They moved to Atlantic Records to focus more on country chart success, but as they prepared 1984's Day By Day, keyboardist Tebes Douglass was killed in a car crash. Soon after, Bobby Gene McNelley left the group to pursue a solo career as a songwriter in Nashville, Tennessee. In 1985, McGuffey Lane was dropped from Atlantic. In 1986, they released a Christmas album in support of the Central Ohio Lung Association; toward the end of that year, they inked a sponsorship with Miller Beer, but a planned comeback fizzled.

The group played into the late 1980s but had dissolved by 1990. In 1995, they reunited after releasing a greatest hits album, and continued performing locally in Ohio into the 2000s. Two full-length releases followed the reunion, in 1998 and 2002. On August 18, 2009,  they opened for Lynyrd Skynyrd at The LC in Columbus, Ohio. In March 2010, Lick Records signed a distribution deal with E1 Entertainment, which allows the new McGuffey Lane album to be sold in Wal-Mart and Best Buy.

Zachariah's Red Eye Reunion
Every January, McGuffey Lane holds an annual reunion concert featuring many acts who also played at Zachariah's Red Eye Saloon. The first two reunions were held at Villa Milano Banquet and Conference Center, located on Schrock Road on the northeast side of Columbus, Ohio. After the initial two events, John Schwab (who is the organizer of the event) started looking for a larger venue to host the reunion concert, as it had outgrown Villa Milano. He settled on Lifestyles Communities Pavilion (now KEMBA Live!). The 2013 Reunion currently holds the indoor attendance record at the LC. The fourteenth anniversary took place on January 25, 2014.

Some acts who have taken part in the event are: Rob McNelly (son of original lead singer Bobby Gene McNelly and current guitarist for Bob Seger and The Silver Bullet Band), John David Call (steel guitarist for Pure Prairie League), Steve Smith, Gary Ballen, Delyn Christian, Tom Ingham, the Dan Orr Project, Cliff Cody, Grassanine, and Erica Blinn.

Members
Terry Efaw – Steel guitar, gutstring guitar, electric guitar
Steve Reis – Bass, vocals
Molly Pauken- Mandolin, acoustic guitar, vocals
Randy Huff – Drums, vocals
Kevin Reed- Harmonica, vocals
John Schwab – Lead guitar, lead vocals
Mike Nugen – Lead guitar, vocals(select dates)

Former members
Bobby Gene McNelly – Lead vocals, acoustic guitar
Stephen "Tebes" Douglass – Keyboards, harmonica, vocals
Dick Smith – Drums, guitar, vocals
Dave Rangeler – Drums, vocals
Tom Ingham – Acoustic guitar, harmonica, vocals
Delyn Christian – Harmonica, vocals
Casey McKeown – Keyboards
Craig Goodwin – Acoustic guitar, vocals
John Campigotto – Drums, vocals
Dave Robins – Saxophone
Joe Pate – Drums, also batman
Tammy Walkup- Backing vocals

Discography

Albums

Singles

Album listings
McGuffey Lane
People Like You
Long Time Lovin' You
Ain't No One (To Love You Like I Do)
Let Me Take You To The Rodeo
Green Country Mountains
Stagecoach
Music Man
Breakaway
Lady Autumn
Stay In Love With You

Aqua Dream
New Beginning
It Comes From The Heart
Dream About You
Tennessee
Don't You Think About Me (When I'm Gone)
Start It All Over
Fair Weather Friends
Fallin' Timber
Bag Of Rags: Black Mountain Rag /Tiger Rag /12th Street Rag(featuring a guest appearance by Charlie Daniels)
Outlaw Rider

Let The Hard Times Roll
Let the Hard Times Toll
Raining Inside and Out
If I Didn't Love You
Too Many Days
Making a Living's Been Killing Me
Doing It Right
Sunshine
You Wouldn't Give Up on Me
If You Were Mine
Never Say Forever

Day By Day
Day by Day
Keep Me Hangin' On
First Time
You've Got a Right
Lorianne
What'll You Do About Me
Wasted Love
Jamaica in My Mind
Hold on to the Night
The Legend

Greatest Hits, Live, and More
Ain't Life Funny
People Like You
Ain't No One (To Love You Like I Do)
Do You Think (We'll Ever Fall In Love)
Diana Might
Outlaw Rider
Let's Hold on to the Night
Long Time Lovin' You
Be a Friend of Mine
Green Country Mountains
The Legend
Rock 'n' Roll (Will Keep You Young)
A New Beginning(Demo)
Leavin' It All Behind(Demo)
Black Mountain Rag(Demo)

Call Me Lucky'
Kid with the Arrow
The Good in Goodbye
There's Only One of Us Now
When I Sing of You
What You've Got
Trains Make Me Lonesome
Call Me Lucky
Baby Don't Call Me Baby (Anymore)
Into the Mystic
The Good Times TonightWoodOld Taylor
Steady As She Goes
Don't You Think About Me
Railroad Song
First Time
It Takes Time
Let's Go
On the Line
Runnin' Wild & Free
Lady Autumn
Nobody But a Fool
Cumberland Gap
'Til the End
The Omen10I Am Who I Am
Bartender
It's A Good Day
You're The One
Lucky Guy
Done With The Devil
I Ain't Giving In To Getting Old
Nobody But A Fool
Song For The Road
Runnin' BlindZachariah's Red Eye Reunion DVD''
The Railroad Song
Don't you think about me (when I'm gone)
The Boys a Dancer
Wild and Free
Breakaway
Tennessee*
Stagecoach*
Stay (in love with you*
Rasputin
Outlaw Rider
On the Line
Rodeo*
People Like You*
Ain't no one*
Green Country Mountain*
Long Time Loving You*
"Backstage Pass"(video interviews backstage)
"Rock Of Ages" (Music video from 1990)
"Bert" music video from 1994)and 'The First Time" (music video from 1983)

Featuring Rob McNelly,son of former lead singer Bobby Gene McNelly

References

Musical groups from Columbus, Ohio
Atlantic Records artists
Musical groups from Ohio
Musical groups from Athens, Ohio